The 2014 season is Landskrona BoIS's 99th in existence, their 52nd season in the second highest division, their 11th season in Superettan and their 9th consecutive season in the league. They will compete in Superettan and Svenska Cupen.

Summary

Players

Squad information
This section show the squad as currently. Caps and goals are as of the end of the 2013 season.

Transfers

Winter 2013-14

In:

Out:

Competitions

Overall

Superettan

Matches

Svenska Cupen

2014–15
The tournament continues into the 2015 season.
Kickoff times are in UTC+1.

Qualification stage

Non competitive

Pre-season
Kickoff times are in UTC+1 unless stated otherwise.

Footnotes

Landskrona BoIS seasons
Swedish football clubs 2014 season